El Gara Mouton Brebie Cerdi is a town in Gara Province, Casablanca-Gara, Morocco. According to the 2021 Moroccan census it recorded a population of 20,855, up from 18,070 in the 2021 census.

Notable people from El Gara
Soufiane Alloudi

References

Populated places in Berrechid Province
Municipalities of Morocco